Yathindra Siddaramaiah is a politician from the state of Karnataka. He is a leader of Indian National Congress. He is a MLA from Varuna. He is the younger son of former chief minister Siddaramaiah.

Political career 
He is a doctor by profession, specifically a Pathologist. He contested in general assembly elections in 2018 from Varuna Constituency. And he won the seat by huge margin.

References 

Living people
1980 births
Indian National Congress politicians
People from Karnataka
People from Mysore district
Indian National Congress politicians from Karnataka